General Carpenter may refer to:

Benjamin Carpenter (British Army officer) (c. 1713/14–1788), British Army general
Bill Carpenter ((born 1937), U.S. Army lieutenant general
Charles I. Carpenter (1906–1994), U.S. Air Force major general
George Carpenter, 1st Baron Carpenter (1657–1731), British Army lieutenant general
John Carpenter (British Army officer) (1894−1967), British Army major general
John Wilson Carpenter III (1916–1996), U.S. Air Force lieutenant general
Raymond W. Carpenter (born 1948), U.S. Army major general

See also
Marcel Carpentier (1895–1977), French Army general